The Tenny River is a  navigable stream connecting Crescent Lake with Panther Pond in the town of Raymond in the U.S. state of Maine. The Tenny River is part of the Presumpscot River watershed, flowing to Casco Bay, an arm of the Atlantic Ocean.

See also
List of rivers of Maine

References

Maine Streamflow Data from the USGS
Maine Watershed Data From Environmental Protection Agency

Rivers of Cumberland County, Maine
Raymond, Maine
Rivers of Maine